is a Japanese language term, translated as "supplementary exercises", that refers to conditioning exercises used in martial arts, especially in karate.  training was designed to develop ambidextrous physical strength, stamina, muscle coordination, speed, and posture. This style of training uses simple, traditional devices made from wood and stone.

Weighted items
The weighted items used in this training are also known as

, meaning "stone mallet" or "weighted levers", are concrete weights attached to a wooden pole. The practitioner grips the end of the wooden pole opposite the concrete weight, and moves the wrist and arms in motions used in techniques normally used in kata or against opponents. This weighted training mostly helps to strengthen the fingers, hands, arms, shoulder, and chest.

are hand-held weights in the shape of padlocks, traditionally made of stone.

are worn like sandals, but require gripping the clogs with one's toes. The practitioner moves around and kicks while wearing them. The extra weight required to move the foot strengthens the leg for kicks.

are ceramic jars filled with sand to different weights. The jars are gripped around a lipped rim. The practitioner moves in varying stances while holding the jar in order to strengthen the arms, shoulders, back, and legs.

The  is a weight hanging by a rope from a wooden handle. The practitioner grasps the handle with the weight hanging in the middle, and twists the handle to wrap the rope around the handle. The handle is raised and lowered throughout the twisting to strengthen the wrists.

A , meaning "to shoulder" or "to carry on one's back", is similar to a modern barbell, made with a wood post and concrete weights on both ends.

Conditioning

The  is a striking board used to practice striking a target that provides resistance. There are two types of :  (hung from the ceiling) and the more common  (secured in the ground).

The flat  is a board mounted in the ground with some type of padding on the top. The round  has a similar construction, but is round on all sides. This allows additional techniques to be practiced.

The  is a box or bowl filled with smooth stones. At the beginning of this exercise, the box is filled with dry rice that is used by striking one's fingers into it. This conditions the fingers and fingertips.

The  is a metal bar formed into an oval that can vary in weight and is used to condition the arms, legs, strengthen the wrists and core.

References

External links
 Burlington Karate & Kobudo Hojo undo
 Okinawa karate supplemental exercises (Hojo undo)
 Shorin-ryu karate of Williamsburg hojo undo
 Bushikan Karate Dojo Goju Ryu Hojo Undo
The poor man's guide to hojo undo equipment

Japanese martial arts equipment
Karate
Okinawan karate